A superfamily of brachiopods containing:

 Family Dalmanellidae
 Family Angusticardiniidae
 Family Dicoelosiidae
 Family Harknessellidae
 Family Heterorthidae
 Family Hypsomyoniidae
 Family Kayserellidae
 Family Mystrophoridae
 Family Paurorthidae
 Family Platyorthidae
 Family Portranellidae
 Family Proschizophoriidae
 Family Rhipidomellidae
 Family Tyronellidae

References

Rhynchonellata